The Theatre War, Cowberry War, Cranberry War or Lingonberry War, was a brief war between Denmark–Norway and Sweden, starting on 24 September 1788, formally lasting until 9 July 1789. Although the decision to launch the attack was taken in Denmark, the majority of the attacking soldiers were Norwegians from the Norwegian army.

The attack was directed towards the region known as Bohuslän in Sweden, and was supposed to act as a diversion to relieve Russia, who was an ally of Denmark–Norway and had recently been attacked by Sweden (Gustav III's Russian War).  This forced Denmark–Norway to honour their alliance between the two states that had been signed in 1773.

Background
When Gustav III of Sweden on his own initiative, and unconstitutionally, attacked Russia in 1788 and thereby started the Russo-Swedish War of 1788–90, Denmark found itself in an awkward position. In the 1773 Treaty of Tsarskoye Selo, Denmark–Norway had committed itself to assist with 12,000 men, six ships of the line and three frigates in the case Russia were to be attacked. Soon after the Swedish attack, the Russians demanded that Denmark–Norway keep its promise, and Denmark–Norway was thus forced to join the war. When Gustav III received news of this, he exclaimed "I am saved!".

Considering that the attack on Russia was Gustav's own initiative, that many Swedish officers and the king's opponents were strongly against the war (see Anjala conspiracy), and that the war was not being fought very successfully, this exclamation might seem strange. However, Gustav III the astute politician saw this as a golden opportunity to turn the Swedish opinion in his favour. He left the battlefront in Finland and proceeded to Stockholm and then Dalarna where he managed to incite several free corps to participate in the defense against the Danes and Norwegians. Despite strong popular support, Sweden had only 10,000 men that had to be divided between Skåne, Jämtland and Bohuslän.

The Danish–Norwegian attack
The first Danish force of about 8,000-10,000 men under the command of Prince Charles of Hesse attacked Bohuslän from Norway on 24 September and advanced quickly toward Vänersborg meeting feeble Swedish resistance. Colonel Johan Werner Tranefelt ensconced himself in Kvistrum north of Uddevalla with his 700 men but was defeated on 29 September by a much larger Danish–Norwegian force led by Major General Johann Friedrich von und zu Mansbach. In a week the Danish–Norwegians took Uddevalla, Vänersborg, and Åmål and on 6 October they demanded the surrender of Gothenburg.

The invading troops met little resistance, and occupied Uddevalla, Vänersborg and Åmål within a week, but were later stopped at Gothenburg. Out of 10,000 soldiers, the Norwegians lost only 8 in the ensuing confrontations.

The defense of Gothenburg
By this time, Gustav III himself had arrived in the city and took resolute action; he dismissed the passive Lieutenant General Anders Rudolf du Rietz and replaced him with Lieutenant General Johan Sparre af Söfdeborg. The defenses of Gothenburg were quickly strengthened. In addition, the British ambassador to Copenhagen Sir Hugh Elliot arrived in Gothenburg and brokered a short armistice with the Danish–Norwegian commander on 9 October. Delaying and stalling tactics prolonged the armistice in stages to May 1789.

Conclusion and aftermath 
Faced with the armistice, threats of a joint attack on Holstein from both Great Britain and Prussia, and an ever more strongly defended Gothenburg, the Danish–Norwegian troops marched off on 12 November 1788 toward Norway, and Gustav III could use this as an excuse to call it a victory. This was convenient for Sweden since the fighting on the Finnish front was very much still in progress.

The success could have turned into a debâcle when it was revealed that a lieutenant Benzelstjärna with the king's approval had planned to burn the seven Russian ships in the Copenhagen harbor. Through the revelation the plans were never carried out.

The attacking Danish–Norwegian force only lost eight men through acts of war. The almost frivolous Swedish and Norwegian names for the conflict do not reflect the real suffering caused by it: the Danish–Norwegian army lost 1,500-3,000 men to hunger, disease, poor sanitary conditions, and exposure to continual autumn rainfall. On 12 November, the Norwegian division retreated back to Norway.

On 9 July 1789, before the threat of a combined might of Britain and Prussia, Denmark-Norway agreed to cease active engagement in the conflict. A statement of neutrality was issued by Denmark-Norway, not a formal peace treaty.

Frederik von Haxthausen took part in this campaign as an officer. As a result of the disastrous provision of the troops, which was the cause of a fatal plague among them, he travelled abroad in 1793 in order to study military supply provision. To do this he visited the Prussian, Austrian and other armies.

The name of the war
The Swedish term "Theatre War" reflects the view in later times that the war in practice was a theatrical spectacle rather than a "real" martial conflict.

In Norwegian, the war is known as Tyttebærkrigen after the Norwegian word for the mountain cranberry, in remembrance of how the Norwegian troops, denied assistance by the local population, had to live off the land in berry season.

See also 
 Russo-Swedish War (1788–1790)

References and sources 

Georg Apenes, Tyttebærkrigen: det norske felttog i Sverige 1788, 1988.

Literature 
 Store norske leksikon retrieved 16 October 2010
 S. A. Sørensen: "Haxthausen, Frederik" article in: Dansk biorgafisk lexikon, Vol. 7. Copenhagen, 1893. pp. 177–179.

Russo-Swedish War (1788–1790)
Wars involving Denmark
Wars involving Norway
Wars involving Sweden
Conflicts in 1789
18th century in Sweden
1788 in Denmark
1789 in Denmark
1788 in Norway
1789 in Norway
1788 in Sweden
1789 in Sweden
History of Bohuslän
Denmark–Sweden relations